Samé or Samé Diomgoma is a village and commune in the Cercle of Kayes in the Kayes Region of south-western Mali. The commune includes 18 villages and lies to the south of the Senegal River. The Dakar-Niger Railway passes through Samé. In 2009 the commune had a population of 12,820.

References

External links
.

Communes of Kayes Region